Year 1044 (MXLIV) was a leap year starting on Sunday of the Julian calendar.

Events 

 By place 

 Europe 
 July 6 – Battle of Ménfő: German troops, under King Henry III (the Black), defeat the Hungarian army, led by King Samuel Aba, who flees the field, but is captured and killed. Peter Orseolo (called the Venetian) becomes (for the second time) king of Hungary, and a vassal of the Holy Roman Empire.
 Summer – Geoffrey II (the Hammer), count of Anjou, captures the city of Tours, and takes control of the county of Touraine.

 Asia 
 The Chinese military treatise of the Wujing Zongyao is written and compiled by scholars Zeng Gongliang (曾公亮), Ding Du (丁度), and Yang Weide (楊惟德), during the Song Dynasty. It is the first book in history to include formulas for gunpowder, and its use for various bombs (thrown by sling or trebuchet catapult). It also describes the double-piston pump flamethrower and a thermoremanence compass, a few decades before Shen Kuo wrote of the first known magnetic mariner's compass. Although emphasizing the importance of many weapons, it reserves high respect for the crossbow, and the ability of crossbowmen to fell charging units of nomadic cavalrymen.
 August 11 – King Anawrahta seizes the throne of the Pagan Empire at Bagan in Burma (modern Myanmar).

 By topic 

 Religion 
 September – A second Roman uprising forces Pope Benedict IX out of Rome. He is succeeded by the new elected (anti)-Pope Sylvester III (until 1045).

Births 
 Abelard of Hauteville, Italo-Norman nobleman (d. 1081)
 Trahaearn ap Caradog, king of Gwynedd (d. 1081)
 Władysław I Herman, duke of Poland (d. 1102)

Deaths 
 January 14 – Adelaide I, abbess of Quedlinburg
 April 19 – Gothelo I (or Gozelo), duke of Lorraine 
 July 6 – Samuel Aba, palatine and king of Hungary
 August 11 – Sokkate, king of the Pagan Empire (b. 1001)
 November 14 – Thietmar of Hildesheim, German bishop
 Abu'l-Husayn al-Basri, Mu'tazilite faqih and theologian
 Rajendra Chola I, emperor of the Chola Dynasty
 Sharif al-Murtaza, Buyid Shia scholar (b. 965)
 Zhao Yuanyan, prince of the Song Dynasty (b. 985)

References